FC Kant-Oil was a Kyrgyzstani football club based in Kant, Kyrgyzstan.

History 
1993: Founded as FC Han-Tengri Kant.
1994: Renamed FC Kant-Oil.
1996: Dissolved.

After the 1996 season, Kant-Oil were disbanded.

Achievements 
Kyrgyzstan League:
Champion: 1994, 1995

Kyrgyzstan Cup:
Semi-finalist: 1994

Current squad

External links 
Career stats by KLISF (only 1993–1995)
Profile at sport.kg

Defunct football clubs in Kyrgyzstan
1996 disestablishments in Kyrgyzstan